Shuangqing District is one of three urban districts in Shaoyang City, Hunan province, China. The district is located in the northeast of the city proper and on the east shore of Zi River, it is bordered by Xinshao County to the north, Shaodong County to the east, Daxiang District to the south, Beita District to the west. The district has six subdistricts, two townships and a town  under its jurisdiction. the government seat is Dongfenglu Subdistrict.

Administrative divisions
6 subdistricts
 Dongfenglu
 Longxutang
 Qiaotou
 Qichezhan
 Xiaojianghu
 Xinglong

2 towns
 Dutouqiao
 Gaochongshan

1 township
 Huochezhan

References 

www.xzqh.org

External links

 
County-level divisions of Hunan
Shaoyang